Andrew Brewer (born March 11, 1986) is a Canadian ice hockey coach. He served as an assistant coach with the Toronto Maple Leafs of the National Hockey League (NHL).

On June 16, 2015, Brewer was named by the Toronto Maple Leafs as an assistant coach under Mike Babcock. His contract was not renewed on August 14, 2020

References

External links

Andrew Brewer's profile at Eliteprospects.com

1986 births
Living people
Canadian ice hockey coaches
Ice hockey people from New Brunswick
Sportspeople from Moncton
Toronto Maple Leafs coaches